Versions is a compilation album by American singer-songwriter Zola Jesus. The album consists of remixes of tracks from her second and third albums as well as one previously unreleased track. It was released in August 2013 under Sacred Bones Records.

Track listing

References

2013 compilation albums
Zola Jesus albums
Sacred Bones Records albums